Michael Weldon Bartrum (born June 23, 1970) is an American football coach and former long snapper and tight end who is currently a senior analyst and special assistant to the head coach for the Marshall Thundering Herd. He played 13 seasons in the National Football League (NFL), and was considered one of the best long snappers while he was playing.  He played for the Kansas City Chiefs, Green Bay Packers, New England Patriots and Philadelphia Eagles.  He retired in 2007 after suffering a neck injury in a 2006 game.

Early life
Bartrum attended Meigs High School in Pomeroy, Ohio and was a letterman in football, basketball, and baseball. In football, he passed for 1,900 yards and 24 touchdowns during his junior and senior seasons.

College career

Bartrum played college football at Marshall University intending to play quarterback, and that lasted all of one practice in August 1988. Bartrum was moved to tight end and was a redshirt in 1988, then backed up All-American Eric Ihnat in 1989. A knee injury in the spring game knocked him out of the 1990 season, but he returned to top form for his junior and senior seasons. In 1991 and 1992, he hauled in 109 receptions and 10 touchdowns, third among tight ends all-time for the Thundering Herd. His senior year, he played on Marshall's first Division I-AA championship team that won a then school record 12 games. Bartrum caught a touchdown pass to open the scoring in the 1992 NCAA Division I-AA Football Championship Game, a 31–28 win over Youngstown State, the team that had defeated Marshall in the prior season's title game. Bartrum was All-Southern Conference second-team TE in 1991 and first-team All-SoCon in 1992 as well as second-team All-American on The Sports Network team that same season. It was his tight end coach, Mark Gale, at Marshall who taught him how to play long snapper, giving him his route to the National Football League.

In 2007, Bartrum was elected to the Marshall University Hall of Fame for his collegiate career in football and baseball.

Professional career
Bartrum saw minimal playing time in his early career and taught special education when he was not playing.  Between the Kansas City Chiefs (1993) and the Green Bay Packers (1995) Bartrum only saw action in a total of seven games with no receptions.

From 1996-1999, he was a regular long snapper with the New England Patriots playing 57 games with two receptions, both of which were touchdowns. He played in Super Bowl XXXI with the Pats in the loss to the Green Bay Packers and teamed with former Marshall teammate Troy Brown for the four years in New England.

Signing with the Eagles in 2000, he took over as the long snapper and tight end. He caught nine passes, four of which went for touchdowns. In 2004, Bartrum handled the long snapper duties in his second Super Bowl appearance when the Eagles lost to the New England Patriots 24-21 in Super Bowl XXXIX played on February 6, 2005. In 2005, he handled kickoff duties in two games due to an injury to David Akers. His play earned him a selection to the Pro Bowl after the 2005 season. In 2006, Bartrum was the emergency quarterback after an injury to Donovan McNabb. Bartrum has six career touchdowns in 11 receptions. Only Mike Vrabel has a higher percentage of catches for touchdowns, with eight career catches which were all for touchdowns.

Due to injuries to his spine in 2006, Bartrum retired in the spring of 2007. He and Brown sponsor a long-running camp at Marshall University for children, and the proceeds of the camp, auction and golf outing weekend have been split between their alma mater and Huntington and Meigs-Pomeroy youth groups for over a decade. In 2007, he was honored on Alumni Weekend at Marshall University as the Distinguished Alumnus of the Year.

After a defeat to the Colts in November 2006, Bartrum complained of extreme pain in his neck. Testing revealed that Bartrum had an "incidental finding of a small chip on one of the bodies of his vertebrae." An MRI showed some bulging in one disc as well as a disc which was "herniated centrally and is lying against his spinal cord." The Eagles placed Bartrum on injured reserve for the remainder of the season, and Jon Dorenbos took over long snapper duties for the Eagles for the remainder of the season. Bartrum remained a member of the Eagles until June 2007, when he announced his retirement from football.

Coaching career

In April 2012, Bartrum was named head football coach of his alma mater, Meigs High School in Pomeroy, Ohio.

On February 8, 2019, the Philadelphia Eagles announced Bartrum as the Eagles' assistant tight ends coach.

In February 2021, Bartrum was hired at Marshall as a senior analyst and special assistant to the head coach under first-year head coach Charles Huff.

Personal
After retiring from his playing career, Bartrum returned to his home town of Pomeroy, Ohio, and started a Christian-based preschool. He also started flag football for the youth of the area and in November 2008 he was elected Meigs County Commissioner. In April 2012, Bartrum was named head football coach of his alma mater, Meigs High School.

References

Further reading
http://www.philadelphiaeagles.com/homeNewsDetail.jsp?id=60359 Neck injury ends Bartrum's season
https://web.archive.org/web/20070103164017/http://www.philadelphiaeagles.com/team/teamRosterDetails.jsp?id=588 Player Page
http://www.philly.com/philly/sports/eagles/Veteran_long_snapper_Bartrum_retires_from_Eagles.html

1970 births
Living people
American football long snappers
American football tight ends
Green Bay Packers players
High school football coaches in Ohio
Kansas City Chiefs players
Marshall Thundering Herd baseball players
Marshall Thundering Herd football coaches
Marshall Thundering Herd football players
National Conference Pro Bowl players
New England Patriots players
People from Gallipolis, Ohio
People from Pomeroy, Ohio
Philadelphia Eagles coaches
Philadelphia Eagles players
Players of American football from Ohio